Xenia (variants include Ksenia, Ksenija, Kseniya; derived from Greek ξενία xenia, "hospitality") is a female given name. The below sections list notable people with one of the variants of this given name.

Related names include Oksana (Ксенія,, Ксения (Russia), Ksenija (Slovenia, Croatia, Lithuania; Ксенија, Serbia, Montenegro, North Macedonia); Kseniya; Xénia (Hungary), and Senja (Finland). In Spain, although it started to become more popular during the 1990s, it appears mainly in Galician as Xenia , and in Catalan as Xènia .

Ksenia

Actresses
 Ksenia Alfyorova (born 1974), Bulgarian-born actress and television presenter in Russia
 Ksenia Khairova (born 1969), Russian stage and film actress
 Ksenia Solo (born 1987), Latvian-Canadian actress

Artistic gymnasts
 Ksenia Afanasyeva (born 1991), Russian artistic gymnast
 Ksenia Dudkina (born 1995), Russian group rhythmic gymnast
 Ksenia Dzhalaganiya (born 1985), Russian group rhythmic gymnast
 Ksenia Kamkova (born 2002), Russian artistic gymnast
 Ksenia Klimenko (born 2003),  Russian artistic gymnast
 Ksenia Polyakova (born 2000), Russian group rhythmic gymnast
 Ksenia Sankovich (born 1990), Belarusian rhythmic gymnast
 Ksenia Semyonova (born 1992), Russian artistic gymnast

Badminton players
 Ksenia Evgenova (born 1996), Russian badminton player
 Ksenia Polikarpova (born 1990), Russian-Israeli badminton player

Footballers (soccer players)
 Ksenia Garanina (born 1997), Russian-Armenian footballer
 Ksenia Khairulina (born 1997), Kazakhstani footballer
 Ksenia Tsybutovich (born 1987), Russian footballer

Ice skaters / ice dancers
 Ksenia Antonova (born 1990), Russian ice dancer
 Ksenia Caesar (1889 – after 1939), Russian ice skater
 Ksenia Doronina (born 1990), Russian ice skater
 Ksenia Konkina (born 2001), Russian ice dancer
 Ksenia Krasilnikova (born 1991), Russian ice skater
 Ksenia Makarova (born 1992), Russian-American ice skater
 Ksenia Monko (born 1992), Russian ice dancer
 Ksenia Ozerova (born 1991), Russian ice skater
 Ksenia Pecherkina (born 1993), Latvian ice dancer
 Ksenia Smetanenko (born 1979), Russian-Armenia ice skater
 Ksenia Stolbova (born 1992), Russian ice skater

Models
 Ksenia Kahnovich (born 1987), Russian fashion model
 Ksenia Kuprina (1908–1981), French model and actress
 Ksenia Sukhinova (born 1987), Russian model, television host, and beauty queen; Miss World 2008

Singers
 Ksenia Novikova (born 1980), Russian singer, actress, and songwriter
 Ksenia Sitnik (born 1995), Belarusian singer

Tennis players
 Ksenia Aleshina (born 2003), Russian tennis player
 Ksenia Gaydarzhi (born 1995), Russian tennis player
 Ksenia Lykina (born 1990), Russian tennis player
 Ksenia Milevskaya (born 1990), Belarusian tennis player
 Ksenia Palkina (born 1989), Russian tennis player
 Ksenia Pervak (born 1991), Russian tennis player

Other sports
 Ksenia Alopina (born 1992), Russian alpine ski racer
 Ksenia Chernykh (fl. 2006–2010), Russian mountain biker
 Ksenia Chibisova (born 1988), Russian judoka
 Ksenia Kablukova (born 1998), Russian ski jumper
 Ksenia Kurach (born 1997), Russian sprint canoeist
 Ksenia Ovsyannikova (born 1985), Russian wheelchair fencer
 Ksenia Parubets (born 1994), Russian volleyball player
 Ksenia Perova (born 1989), Russian archer
 Ksenia Popova (born 1988), Russian open water swimmer
 Ksenia Tikhonenko (born 1993), Russian basketball player 
 Ksenia Zadorina (born 1987), Russian sprinter
 Ksenia Zakordonskaya (born 2003), Russian handballer

Other non-sporting
 Ksenia Anske (barn 1976), Russian-born American author of short fiction and novels
 Ksenia Goryacheva (born 1996), Russian political figure
 Ksenia Kepping (1937–2002), Russian linguist
 Ksenia Milicevic (born 1942), French painter, architect and town planner
 Ksenia Pokrovsky (1942–2013), Russian-American religious painter
 Ksenia Aleksandrovna Razumova (born 1931), Russian physicist
 Ksenia Schnaider, Ukrainian clothing designer
 Ksenia Sobchak (born 1981), Russian public figure, TV anchor, and journalist
 Ksenia Svetlova (born 1977), Israeli politician and journalist
 Ksenia Zsikhotska (born 1989), Ukrainian dancer and choreographer

Ksenija

Actresses
 Ksenija Marinković (born 1966), Croatian film, television and theatre actress
 Ksenija Pajić (born 1961), Croatian actress

Singers
 Ksenija Knežević (born 1996), Serbian-Montenegrin singer
 Ksenija Milošević (born 1982), Serbian singer
 Ksenija Pajčin (1977–2010), Serbian singer and model; sometimes referred to as Xenia or Xenija

Track & field athletes
 Ksenija Balta (born 1986), Estonian long jumper, sprinter, and heptathlete
 Ksenija Predikaka (born 1970), Slovenian long jumper

Other sports
 Ksenija Jastsenjski (born 1982), Serbian figure skater
 Ksenija Nagle (born 2003), Latvian footballer
 Ksenija Voishal (born 1994), Belarusian basketball player

Other non-sporting
 Ksenija Atanasijević (1894–1981), Serbian philosopher
 Ksenija Bulatović (born 1967), Serbian architect
 Ksenija Lukich (born 1990), Serbian-Australian model
 Ksenija Pavlovic, Belgrade-born American journalist and author
 Ksenija Sidorova (born 1988), Latvian accordionist
 Ksenija Turković (born 1964), Croatian jurist
 Ksenija Zečević (1956–2006), Serbian pianist

Kseniya

Actresses
 Kseniya Alexandrova (born 1994), Russian model and actress
 Kseniya Borodina (born 1983), Russian television presenter and actress
 Kseniya Kachalina (born 1971), Russian actress
 Kseniya Kutepova (born 1971), Russian actress
 Kseniya Mishyna (born 1989), Ukrainian film and stage actress
 Kseniya Rappoport (born 1974), Russian actress

Footballers
 Kseniya Kovalenko (born 1990), Russian footballer
 Kseniya Senina (fl. 2010), Uzbekistani footballer

Handballers
 Kseniya Makeyeva (born 1990), Russian handballer
 Kseniya Milova (born 1992), Russian handballer
 Kseniya Nikandrova (born 1987), Kazakhstani handballer

Runners / sprinters
 Kseniya Agafonova (born 1983), Russian long-distance runner
 Kseniya Aksyonova (born 1988), Russian sprinter
 Kseniya Karandyuk (born 1986), Ukrainian sprinter
 Kseniya Ryzhova (born 1987), Russian sprinter

Other sports
 Kseniya Baylo (born 2005), Ukrainian diver
 Kseniya Dobrynina (born 1994), Russian racing cyclist
 Kseniya Dziatsuk (born 1986), Belarusian triple jumper
 Kseniya Grigoreva (born 1987), Uzbekistani alpine skier
 Kseniya Markitantova (born 1981), Ukrainian Paralympic archer
 Kseniya Moskvina (born 1989), Russian swimmer
 Kseniya Moustafaeva (born 1995), Belarus-born French rhythmic gymnast
 Kseniya Pantelyeyeva (born 1994), Ukrainian fencer
 Kseniya Sadouskaya (born 1991), Belarusian speed skater
 Kseniya Stankevich (born 1996), Belarusian freestyle wrestler
 Kseniya Sydorenko (born 1986), Ukrainian synchronized swimmer
 Ksenyia Tuhai (born 1995), Belarusian cyclist
 Kseniya Zikunkova (born 1979), Belarusian biathlete

Other non-sporting
 Kseniya Boguslavskaya (1892–1972), Russian artist
 Kseniya Garaschuk (born 1982), Minsk-born Canadian mathematician
 Kseniya Konstantinova (1925–1943), Red Army medic and Hero of the Soviet Union
 Kseniya Ryabinkina, Russian ballet dancer 
 Kseniya Simonova (born 1985), Ukrainian artist
 Kseniya Yorsh (born 1990), Belarusian-born film producer in the United States

Xenia

Actresses
 Xenia Desni (1894–1962), Ukrainian actress of the silent era
 Xenia Goodwin (born 1994), Australian actress and dancer
 Xenia Gratsos (1940–2018), Greek-American actress
 Xenia Kalogeropoulou (born 1936), Greek actress
 Xenia Seeberg (born 1967), German film and television actress
 Xenia Tchoumitcheva (born 1987), Russian-Swiss model and actress
 Xenia Valderi (born 1926), Yugoslav-born Italian actress

Aristocrats
 Grand Duchess Xenia Alexandrovna of Russia (1875–1960), sister of Tsar Nicholas II
 Princess Xenia Georgievna of Russia (1903–1965), daughter of Grand Duke George Mihailovich of Russia
 Princess Xenia of Montenegro (1887–1960), daughter of Nicholas I of Montenegro
 Xenia of Yaroslavl (died c. 1290), regent of Yaroslavl 
 Xenia Borisovna (1582–1622), daughter of Tsar Boris Godunov

Dancers
 Xenia Borovansky (1903–1985), Russian-born dancer and choreographer, based in Australia after 1939
 Xenia Makletzova (1892–1974), Russian ballet dancer
 Xenia Zarina (1903–1967), American dancer

Musicians
 Xenia Jankovic (born 1958), Serbian-Russian cellist
 Xenia Boodberg Lee (1927–2004), American pianist
 Xénia Maliarevitch (born 1980), French classical pianist

Religious figures
 Saint Xenia (disambiguation), several people
 Xenia of Rome (died c. 450), saint of the 5th century
 Xenia of Saint Petersburg ( – ), patron saint

Singers
 Xenia (singer) (born 1994; Xenia Edith Martinez), singer on the TV series The Voice
 Xenia Belmas (1890–1981), Ukrainian soprano
 Xênia França (born 1986), Brazilian singer-songwriter
 Xenia Rubinos (born 1985), American singer-songwriter

Swimmers
 Xenia Palazzo (born 1998), Italian Paralympic swimmer
 Xenia Peni (born 1983), Papua New Guinean swimmer

Volleyball players
 Xenia Ivanov (born 1970), Romanian volleyball player
 Xenia Staffelbach (born 1998), Swiss volleyball player

Other sports
 Xenia Estrada (born 1990), Salvadoran cyclist
 Xenia Georgiou (born 1988), Cypriot footballer
 Xenia Knoll (born 1992), Swiss tennis player
 Xénia Krizsán (born 1993), Hungarian heptathlete
 Xénia Siska (born 1957), Hungarian hurdler
 Xenia Smits (born 1994), Belgian-born German handballer
 Xenia Stad-de Jong (1922–2012), Dutch sprinter

Other non-sporting
 Xenia, name given by Bryan Sykes to a theoretical founding ancestor of Haplogroup X (mtDNA)
 Xenia Benivolski, Canadian art curator
 Xenia Cage (1913–1995), American surrealist sculptor
 Xenia Deli (born 1989), Moldovan-American model
 Xenia Denikina (1892–1973), Russian writer
 Xenia Ghali (born 1989), Greek songwriter, record producer and disc jockey
 Xenia Hausner (born 1951), Austrian painter and stage designer
 Xenia Onatopp, a fictional villainess from James Bond's GoldenEye
 Xenia de la Ossa (born 1958), Costa Rican physicist
 Xenia Shestova (1560–1631), Russian nun and mother of Mikhail I of Russia
 Xenia Wickett, British-American executive coach and international advisor

Other variants

 Aksinya Sergeeva (1726–1756), Russian ballerina
 Ksenya Stepanycheva (born 1978), Russian playwright
 Xeniya Volnukhina (born 1982), Kazakhstani handballer
 Xènius, male version, nom de plume of Eugeni d'Ors
 Zenia Stampe (born 1979), Danish politician

See also
 Xenia (disambiguation)
 Xena (disambiguation)

Notes

Given names
Russian feminine given names
Serbian feminine given names
Slavic feminine given names
Greek feminine given names
Spanish feminine given names
Catalan feminine given names